Adam Files (born 7 January 1993) is a professional rugby league footballer who plays for the Oldham in the Kingstone Press Championship.

Files came through the Salford City Reds academy and joined Oldham on a season-long loan deal for the 2013 season.

References

External links
Oldham R.L.F.C. profile

1993 births
Living people
English rugby league players
Oldham R.L.F.C. players
Rugby league hookers
Rugby league players from Salford
Salford Red Devils players